Hot is the 42nd studio album by American musician James Brown. The album was released on January 1, 1976, by Polydor Records.

Track listing
All tracks composed by James Brown; except where indicated

Personnel
James Brown - lead vocals, arrangements
Dave Matthews - arrangements
Bob Both - recording supervisor, engineer
David Stone, Major Little - engineer
Michael Doret - artwork

References

1976 albums
James Brown albums
Albums arranged by David Matthews (keyboardist)
Albums produced by James Brown
Polydor Records albums